Nebria boiteli is a species of ground beetle in the Nebriinae subfamily that is endemic to Morocco.

References

boiteli
Beetles described in 1932
Beetles of North Africa
Endemic fauna of Morocco